The 2019 season is Chonburi's 14th season in the Thai League T1  since 2006.

Players

Squad information
As of 19 July 2019

Out on loan

Competitions

Overview

Thai League

League table

Results summary

Results by matchday

Matches

FA Cup

League Cup

References

External links
 Chonburi F.C. Official Website
 Thai League Official Website

Chonburi F.C. seasons
Association football in Thailand lists
CBR